Maria Zbyrowska (born 2 November 1956 in Jaźwiny, Podkarpackie Voivodeship) is a Polish politician. She was elected to the Sejm on 25 September 2005, getting 12171 votes in 23 Rzeszów district, as a candidate from Samoobrona Rzeczpospolitej Polskiej list.

She was also a member of Sejm 2001-2005.

See also
Members of Polish Sejm 2005-2007

External links
Maria Zbyrowska - parliamentary page - includes declarations of interest, voting record, and transcripts of speeches.

Members of the Polish Sejm 2005–2007
Members of the Polish Sejm 2001–2005
Women members of the Sejm of the Republic of Poland
Self-Defence of the Republic of Poland politicians
1956 births
Living people
21st-century Polish women politicians